Gaza is a 2019 documentary film directed by Irish filmmakers Garry Keane and Andrew McConnell, which premiered at the Sundance Film Festival. It portrays the everyday life of Gazan citizens. It was selected as the Irish entry for the Best International Feature Film at the 92nd Academy Awards, but it was not nominated.

Reception 
Gaza has received generally positive reviews from critics. The website's critics consensus reads: "Uniquely revelatory and altogether enlightening, Gaza allows audiences to settle into the unique rhythms of ordinary life in a region roiled by conflict."

The film was also rated four stars by Wendy Ide, a reviewer from The Observer, and Peter Bradshaw.

See also
 List of submissions to the 92nd Academy Awards for Best International Feature Film
 List of Irish submissions for the Academy Award for Best International Feature Film

References

External links
 

2019 films
2019 documentary films
Irish documentary films
Films set in the Gaza Strip